The ATP Linz is a defunct men's tennis tournament that was played on the Grand Prix tennis circuit in 1979, 1981 to 1982. The event was held in Linz, Austria and was played on various surfaces.

Past finals

Singles

Doubles

References
ATP Linz 1981 
ATP Linz 1982 

Clay court tennis tournaments
Carpet court tennis tournaments
Indoor tennis tournaments
Tennis tournaments in Austria
ATP Tour
Defunct tennis tournaments in Europe
Defunct sports competitions in Austria